Hymenostemma is a genus of flowering plants in the daisy family.

Species
There is only one known species, Hymenostemma pseudanthemis, native to Spain and Morocco.

formerly included
see Mauranthemum 
 Hymenostemma fontanesii Willk. - Mauranthemum paludosum (Poir.) Vogt & Oberpr.
 Hymenostemma paludosum (Poir.) Pomel - Mauranthemum paludosum (Poir.) Vogt & Oberpr.

References

Monotypic Asteraceae genera
Anthemideae
Flora of Spain
Flora of Portugal